Park is an unincorporated community in Barren County, Kentucky, United States.

Notable people
Louie B. Nunn, Governor of Kentucky

References

Unincorporated communities in Barren County, Kentucky
Unincorporated communities in Kentucky